1 Combat Engineer Regiment (1 CER) is a Regular Force regiment of the Royal Canadian Engineers (RCE) commanded by a lieutenant-colonel.  Its headquarters is in the Patton Building at CFB Edmonton (Steele Barracks), Alberta, and it is assigned to 1 Canadian Mechanized Brigade Group.

History 
1 CER was continually involved with rotations to Afghanistan as part of the ongoing War on Terror. Due to the regiment's special armoured engineer capability, every Canadian rotation since 2006 had a minimum of an armoured troop from 1 CER attached. As of the start of 2011, 1 CER had six soldiers killed in Afghanistan.

Organization

Armoured engineers
1 CER is different from other CERs units as it holds the Canadian Army's armoured engineer capability. Formerly this was provided by the Badger Armoured Engineer Vehicle (AEV) Since 2018 the Badger AEV has been replaced by a new Leopard 2 based AEV that is known in Canadian service as the Ram AEV2.

Order of precedence

References

Citations

Notes

External links
 

Engineer regiments of Canada
Military units and formations established in 1977
1977 establishments in Canada